Tricho–rhino–phalangeal syndrome type 2  (also known as Langer–Giedion syndrome) is a genetic disorder consisting of fine and sparse scalp hair, thin nails, pear-shaped broad nose, and cone-shaped epiphyses of the middle phalanges of some fingers and toes.

It has been associated with TRPS1.

See also
 Skin lesion
 List of cutaneous conditions

References

External links 

Genodermatoses
Syndromes